Kayky da Silva Chagas (born 11 June 2003), known as Kayky, is a Brazilian professional footballer who plays as a forward for Campeonato Brasileiro Série A club Bahia, on loan from Premier League club Manchester City.

Club career

Fluminense
Born in Rio de Janeiro, Kayky was initially rejected a place in the Fluminense academy, as the club had filled their spaces, and instead joined local side Mangueira. In his first game, he scored a hattrick in a 5–3 win over Fluminense, prompting Flu to immediately sign him. He initially joined up with their under-9 futsal squad. He transitioned to football during his development, and was an important unit of the under-17 squad which won the 2020 Campeonato Brasileiro Sub-17.

Promoted to the main squad for the 2021 campaign, Kayky made his professional debut on 4 March of that year, coming on as a first-half substitute for fellow youth graduate Miguel Silveira in a 1–2 Campeonato Carioca away loss against Resende. He scored his first professional goal on 6 April, netting the opener in a 4–0 away routing of Macaé. On 11 April, Kayky scored Flus opener in a 3–1 home win against Nova Iguaçu through an individual effort, after dribbling past four opponents. On 6 May, he became the youngest player to score in the Copa Libertadores for Fluminense, at age 17, in the 1–1 draw with Junior.

Manchester City
In April 2021, several media sources reported that Kayky and teammate Metinho (who signed for City's partner club Troyes) had both agreed to a move to Manchester City for a combined fee of €15 million; Kayky's deal alone would cost €10 million, with another 15 in variables. On 23 April, the agreement was officially confirmed, with the transfer set to go through in January 2022. However in August, it was announced that Kayky would join immediately instead of January. Fluminense would retain a percentage of any future sale and add-ons. On 7 January 2022, Kayky made his City debut as a substitute for Cole Palmer, in a 4–1 away win over League Two side Swindon Town in the FA Cup. On 12 February 2022, he made his Premier League debut as a substitute for Riyad Mahrez, in a 4–0 away win over Norwich City.

On 13 August 2022, Kayky signed for Paços de Ferreira on a season-long loan. He was recalled in December 2022. On 13 January 2023, Kayky signed for Brazilian club Bahia on loan for the entire 2023 season.

International career
Constantly called up to trainings with the Brazil under-15 and under-17 squads, Kayky featured in two friendlies for the under-16 side in 2019.

Style of play
A left-footed right-sided forward, Kayky is often compared to Neymar due to his dribbling ability. He celebrates his goals by doing a moustache with his hand, as an honour to his father.

Career statistics

Notes

References

2003 births
Living people
Footballers from Rio de Janeiro (city)
Brazilian footballers
Brazil youth international footballers
Association football forwards
Fluminense FC players
Manchester City F.C. players
F.C. Paços de Ferreira players
Esporte Clube Bahia players
Campeonato Brasileiro Série A players
Premier League players
Primeira Liga players
Brazilian expatriate footballers
Brazilian expatriate sportspeople in England
Brazilian expatriate sportspeople in Portugal
Expatriate footballers in England
Expatriate footballers in Portugal